Dick Spring (born 29 August 1950) is an Irish businessman and former politician. He was a Labour Party Teachta Dála (TD) for the Kerry North  from 1981 to 2002. He became leader of the Labour Party in 1982, and held this position until 1997. He served as Minister for the Environment (1982–83), Minister for Energy (1983–87) and Minister for Foreign Affairs (1993–Nov. 1994, Dec. 1994–97).

He served as Tánaiste during those three governments. Prior to his political career Spring was a successful sportsman who played for the Ireland national rugby union team and the Kerry GAA football and hurling teams.

Early life
Spring was born in Tralee, County Kerry in 1950, the son of Dan and Anna Spring (née Laide). He was educated at Cistercian College in Roscrea, County Tipperary, and at Trinity College Dublin, and qualified as a barrister at King's Inns. He is a descendant of the Anglo-Irish Spring family that settled in County Kerry in the late 16th century.

Sporting career
Spring played Gaelic football and hurling for Kerry during the 1970s. He played his club football with the Kerins O'Rahilly's club in Tralee and hurling with Crotta O'Neill's, he also played underage hurling with Austin Stacks and won a minor county championship in 1967. His father Dan won two All-Ireland Senior Football Championships in 1939 and 1940.

He then won rugby union caps for Munster, and lined out for London Irish in the UK. He also was capped for Ireland three times during the 1979 Five Nations Championship, debuting against  on 20 January 1979 at Lansdowne Road, and receiving his last international cap on 17 February 1979 against  at Lansdowne Road.

Political career

Early career
Spring's political life began in 1979, when he successfully contested the local elections in Tralee. He replaced his father Dan Spring TD on Kerry County Council that year. Spring senior had been a TD for Kerry North since 1943, mostly representing Labour, but he was briefly a member of National Labour.

He was first elected to Dáil Éireann in the general election of 1981 for the constituency of Kerry North, the seat previously held by his father Dan. The Labour Party formed a coalition Government with Fine Gael and Spring was appointed a junior minister on his first day as a Deputy. When Michael O'Leary resigned as party leader after the February 1982 general election, Spring allowed his name to go forward in the leadership contest. He easily defeated Barry Desmond and Michael D. Higgins, but inherited the leadership of a deeply divided party. Spring was a strong opponent of anti-coalition politics and systematically removed Trotskyist activists from the party. Most notably he expelled the Militant Tendency (later Socialist Party), including Joe Higgins and Clare Daly.

Ministerial appointment
Following the November 1982 general election Labour again formed a coalition government with Fine Gael. Spring was appointed Tánaiste and Minister for the Environment. He was closely involved in the negotiations which led to the Anglo-Irish Agreement in 1985. In 1987, the Labour Party withdrew from the government on budgetary issues, and Fianna Fáil took power in the subsequent election. Spring himself narrowly escaped losing his seat when he was re-elected by just four votes.

Opposition
Under Spring, the Labour Party selected Mary Robinson as its candidate in the 1990 presidential election. Robinson was elected, and this success enhanced the credibility of his leadership of the party. For Spring, his period in opposition coincided, with the exposure of a number of business scandals and gave him the opportunity to shine as a critic of the Fianna Fáil government, led by the controversial Charles Haughey.

"Spring Tide" and return to power
As a result, in the 1992 general election the party increased its number of Dáil seats from 15 to 33, at the time its largest-ever number, an event which is referred to as the "Spring Tide". After the election, no government could be appointed when the new Dáil met. After some weeks of stalemate, Spring decided to enter negotiations with Albert Reynolds—who had taken over as Taoiseach from Haughey at the beginning of the year—over the Christmas period on a new programme for government. The Labour Party then entered a coalition government with Fianna Fáil, and thus returned Reynolds to power. Spring was appointed Tánaiste for the second time, and also Minister for Foreign Affairs. This was approved by a special party conference of over 1,000 delegates at Dublin's National Concert Hall in January 1993, though there were some Labour Party TDs who dissented from the leadership position and wanted a coalition with Fine Gael.

Labour took six of the fifteen cabinet ministries and had much of its election manifesto accepted by Fianna Fáil. New Departments of Equality and Law Reform, and of Arts and Culture, were established. Ethics legislation was to outlaw conflicts of interest. Male homosexual acts were to be decriminalised. Purchase of condoms without medical prescription was to be allowed. An extensive programme of family law reform and provision for a divorce referendum was to be undertaken. Spring insisted on a formalised system of programme managers, and state-paid advisers to push the new Government's policy platform.

However support for the Labour Party declined, particularly as many voters felt betrayed at Labour for going into government with Fianna Fáil. In 1994 the Labour Party performed disastrously in two by-elections, in Dublin South-Central and in Cork North-Central. In both cases the seats were won by Democratic Left. This had grave implications for the electoral health of the party and therefore for the policy of the Labour leadership. Clearly Labour was not doing well electorally, and needed to assess its role in the coalition.

In late 1994, Reynolds wished to appoint the Attorney General, Harry Whelehan, as President of the High Court, but delayed for over a month. Spring had reservations about Whelehan being suitable, owing to the alleged laxity of his handling of a particular child abuse criminal case, involving a disgraced Catholic priest. Reynolds for his part could not understand why Spring was against Whelehan being nominated to the High Court, and yet had no concerns with Whelehan serving as Attorney General. Reynolds became annoyed with Spring's stance, his failure to communicate his reservations, and decided to proceed anyway, whilst calling Spring's bluff. Spring withdrew with his ministers from the cabinet meeting which proceeded to recommend Mr Whelehan's appointment to the President. Immediately afterward, Reynolds implemented the decision.

There followed a rather heated discussion in the Dáil, concerning the appointment. Fine Gael started asking questions about Whelehan's suitability and objectivity. This was supportive of Spring's position. Democratic Left TD Pat Rabbitte then implied that the Catholic hierarchy were instructing Reynolds to appoint Whelehan. Reynolds became irate with this allegation, and responded angrily. Reynolds now realised that Spring was uncompromising about Whelehan. In an effort to remain in government, Reynolds removed Whelehan; however, Spring refused to go back into government with Reynolds. Whelehan served as President of the High Court for one day.

Spring proceeded to withdraw from government. The minority Reynolds government then lost a vote of confidence in the Dáil. Reynolds resigned as party leader, but continued as a caretaker Taoiseach. Spring entered into negotiations with Reynolds' new successor, Bertie Ahern, the Minister for Finance. They agreed to reform the Fianna Fáil-Labour Government in early December. On the eve of that government being formed, The Irish Times published a report that Ahern knew more about an aspect of the scandal that had brought down Reynolds than had previously been known. Spring broke off negotiations with Fianna Fáil, and instead pursued negotiations to form a coalition with Fine Gael and Democratic Left. In December of that year, Labour together with Fine Gael and Democratic Left formed a coalition government, referred to as the Rainbow Coalition, forestalling the possibility of an election. Spring returned to his positions as Tánaiste and Minister for Foreign Affairs. This was the first occasion on which a new Irish government was formed without a general election. The previous Fianna Fáil and Labour Programme for Government was substantially adopted by the new government and in return for making John Bruton the Taoiseach, Ruairi Quinn of Labour became the first-ever Labour Minister for Finance.

During his period as Foreign Minister, Spring along with Reynolds was involved in negotiations leading to the Provisional Irish Republican Army and loyalist ceasefires of 1994 and the Good Friday Agreement of 1998. With Albert Reynolds, he received warm applause in the Dáil on the announcement of the Downing Street Declaration in December 1993. He also advanced Ireland's membership of the Partnership for Peace, a sister organization of NATO a controversial issue due to Ireland's policy of neutrality.

Resignation as party leader and defeat as TD
In the 1997 general election the Labour Party returned to opposition, winning only 17 of its outgoing 33 seats. This was considered by some to be a punishment by the electorate for the 1993 decision to enter coalition with Fianna Fáil. By others, it was considered a punishment for changing horses at the end of 1994, in order to remain in power. A front-page article in the Irish Independent on the day prior to the election, entitled "Payback Time" and calling on support for Fianna Fáil, had a direct and severe impact on the Labour Party. The Independent newspaper group had revealed many scandals involving Labour ministers abusing the perks of office in the year leading up to the election. The article was controversial, because Spring had taken decisions in office which went against the broader business interests of the Independent's owner Anthony O'Reilly, who was accused by Labour supporters of having attempted to use his paper's political influence to intimidate the Government into favouring companies linked to O'Reilly. The impact of the article is uncertain but the Labour Party suffered significant electoral losses and the outgoing coalition was defeated. In the presidential election of the same year the Labour Party candidate, Adi Roche, came fourth out of five candidates. Following that defeat, Spring resigned as Labour Party leader, having served 15 years — one of the longest-serving party leaders of Ireland.

He remained a TD, being appointed a director in the formerly state owned recently privatized telecommunications company Eircom in 1999. Its initial flotation led to a stock market bubble which affected a large number of small shareholders. It was later revealed that he did not purchase shares in the company.

Spring lost his seat in a shock result at the 2002 general election. He has not sought political office since.

Political legacy
In Irish political circles, the role of foreign minister was considered a poisoned chalice because of the challenge of resolving the delicate problem of how to de-escalate tensions in Northern Ireland, when both sides were wary of Irish governmental policy. Albert Reynolds, and Dick Spring, placed Northern Ireland at the top of the government agenda. Both were helped considerably by the initiative of John Hume, and the understanding built up between Reynolds, and British Prime Minister John Major. Spring devoted considerable energy and resources towards increasing Ireland's international influence and diplomatic ties in UN, in the post Cold War world.

As Foreign Minister, there was much critical comment in the media on Spring's extensive foreign travel. Spring got even harsher criticism, for using the Government Jet to reduce journey times between his home in Tralee and his office in Dublin. However, he did conduct, for the first time, a public consultative process that involved a wide range of citizenry and social groups as well as members of the diaspora, in the re-shaping of Irish foreign policy through the first ever White Paper on Foreign Policy in 1996.

Critics of Dick Spring have described him as a champagne socialist, owing to his choice of the Waldorf Astoria Hotel when staying in New York as Foreign Minister, instead of staying in the then Irish-owned Fitzpatrick Hotel. Spring brought the Irish Labour Party unprecedented exposure and power in government, at a time when the two significantly larger right-of-centre political blocs had precedence in every election.

Subsequent life
Spring later became involved in the Cyprus dispute as a United Nations envoy.

Spring received a directorship appointment to the Irish state telecom enterprise, Eircom, in advance of the scheduled privatisation. As leader of a left of centre party, this was to endorse the privatization, and gain consent from the labour unions to the privatisation plan. However the privatisation was a financial disaster for members of the public, who became ordinary shareholders in the privatisation process. Spring became the target for much of the discontent. Spring's low work involvement, and generous remuneration package, was openly described as 'scandalous', by shareholder advocate Senator Shane Ross. He continues to hold a directorship, with the Financial Services firm FEXCO, based in Killorglin, County Kerry.

Spring lives in Tralee with his wife Kristi, an American whom he met while working in New York as a bartender. They have three children. His nephew Arthur Spring was a Labour Party TD for Kerry North–West Limerick until March 2016, having first been a councillor for the Tralee electoral area of Kerry County Council. Spring is a member of Ballybunion Golf Club, and has invited former U.S. President Bill Clinton, amongst others, to visit there.

He is a director of Allied Irish Bank and receives annual pension payments of €121,108.

See also
Families in the Oireachtas

References

External links

1950 births
Living people
Alumni of Trinity College Dublin
Austin Stacks hurlers
Crotta O'Neill's hurlers
Dual players
Gaelic footballers who switched code
Ireland international rugby union players
Irish businesspeople
Irish rugby union players
Irish people of Norman descent
Irish sportsperson-politicians
Kerins O'Rahilly's Gaelic footballers
Kerry inter-county Gaelic footballers
Kerry inter-county hurlers
Labour Party (Ireland) TDs
Lansdowne Football Club players
Leaders of the Labour Party (Ireland)
Local councillors in County Kerry
London Irish players
Members of the 22nd Dáil
Members of the 23rd Dáil
Members of the 24th Dáil
Members of the 25th Dáil
Members of the 26th Dáil
Members of the 27th Dáil
Members of the 28th Dáil
Ministers for the Environment (Ireland)
Ministers for Foreign Affairs (Ireland)
Ministers of State of the 22nd Dáil
Munster Rugby players
People educated at Cistercian College, Roscrea
People from Tralee
Politicians from County Kerry
Rugby union fullbacks
Tánaistí
Alumni of King's Inns